The 1982 Paris Open was a Grand Prix men's tennis tournament played on indoor carpet courts. It was the 13th edition of the Paris Open (later known as the Paris Masters). It took place at the Palais omnisports de Paris-Bercy in Paris, France, from 25 October through 1 November 1982. Third-seeded Wojciech Fibak won the singles title.

Finals

Singles

 Wojciech Fibak defeated  Bill Scanlon 6–2, 6–2, 6–2
 It was Fibak's 5th title of the year and the 56th of his career.

Doubles

 Brian Gottfried /  Bruce Manson defeated  Jay Lapidus /  Richard Meyer 6–4, 6–2
 It was Gottfried's 6th title of the year and the 75th of his career. It was Manson's 2nd title of the year and the 9th of his career.

References

External links 
 ATP tournament profile